The 2016–17 season is U.S. Lecce's fifth consecutive season in Lega Pro after their relegation from Serie A at the end of the 2011–12 season. The club competed in Lega Pro Girone C, finishing 2nd, in the Coppa Italia, where the club was knocked out in the third round by Genoa, and in the Coppa Italia Lega Pro, where the club was knocked out by Matera in the round of 32.

Players

Squad information

Players in italics left the club during the season

Transfers

Summer session

Winter session

Competitions

Overall

Lega Pro

League table

Results summary

Results by round

Matches

Play-offs

Round of 16

Quarterfinals

Coppa Italia Lega Pro

Matches

References

U.S. Lecce seasons
Lecce